Richard Francis Ploog (27 November 1936 – 14 July 2002) was an Australian cyclist. He competed at the 1956 Summer Olympics, winning a bronze medal in the sprint event.

References

External links
 
 
 

1936 births
2002 deaths
Australian male cyclists
Olympic cyclists of Australia
Cyclists at the 1956 Summer Olympics
Sportspeople from Ballarat
Olympic bronze medalists for Australia
Olympic medalists in cycling
Medalists at the 1956 Summer Olympics
Commonwealth Games medallists in cycling
Commonwealth Games gold medallists for Australia
Cyclists at the 1954 British Empire and Commonwealth Games
Cyclists at the 1958 British Empire and Commonwealth Games
Medallists at the 1954 British Empire and Commonwealth Games
Medallists at the 1958 British Empire and Commonwealth Games